Histone deacetylase 8 is an enzyme that in humans is encoded by the HDAC8 gene.

Function 

Histones play a critical role in transcriptional regulation, cell cycle progression, and developmental events. Histone acetylation / deacetylation alters chromosome structure and affects transcription factor access to DNA. The protein encoded by this gene belongs to class I of the histone deacetylase/acuc/apha family. It has histone deacetylase activity and represses transcription when tethered to a promoter.

Histone deacetylase 8 is involved in skull morphogenesis and metabolic control of the ERR-alpha / PGC1-alpha transcriptional complex.

Clinical significance 

HDAC8 has been linked to number of disease states notably to acute myeloid leukemia and is related to actin cytoskeleton in smooth muscle cells. siRNA targeting HDAC8 showed anticancer effects. Inhibition of HDAC8 induced apoptosis has been observed in T cell lymphomas. In addition the HDAC8 enzyme has been implicated in the pathogenesis of neuroblastoma. Therefore, there has been interest in developing HDAC8 selective inhibitors. At least 20 disease-causing mutations in this gene have been discovered.

Interactions
 ERR-alpha.

See also
 Histone deacetylase

References

Further reading

External links 
 

EC 3.5.1